Human torpedoes or manned torpedoes are a type of diver propulsion vehicle on which the diver rides, generally in a seated position behind a fairing. They were used as secret naval weapons in World War II. The basic concept is still in use.

The name was commonly used to refer to the weapons that Italy, and later (with a larger version) Britain, deployed in the Mediterranean and used to attack ships in enemy harbors. The human torpedo concept has occasionally been used by recreational divers, although this use is closer to midget submarines.

History of common wartime models
The concept of a small, manned submarine carrying a bomb was developed and patented by a British naval officer in 1909, but was never used during the First World War. The Italian Navy experimented with a primitive tiny sub (Mignatta) carrying two men and a limpet mine: this craft successfully sank  Austro-Hungarian battleship SMS Viribus Unitis on 1 November 1918.

The first truly practical human torpedo was the Italian Maiale (nicknamed the "pig" because it was difficult to steer) used in the Second World War.

Two crewmen in diving suits rode astride, each equipped with an oxygen rebreather apparatus. They steered the craft to the enemy ship. On arrival at the target, the detachable warhead was released for use as a limpet mine. If they were not detected, the operators then rode the mini sub away to safety.

Development began in 1935 but the first 11 were not completed until 1939 by San Bartolomeo Torpedo Workshops in La Spezia, Italy and a larger number followed. The official Italian name for the majority of the craft that were manufactured was Siluro a Lenta Corsa (SLC or "Slow-running torpedo"). Two distinct models were made, Series 100 and then (in 1942) Series 200 with some improvements. At least 50 SLCs were built by September 1943.

In operation, the Maiale torpedo was carried by another vessel (usually a conventional submarine), and launched near the target. Most manned torpedo operations were at night and during the new moon to cut down the risk of being seen. This feat encouraged the British to develop their own torpedo "chariots".

The last Italian model, the SSB (for Siluro San Bartolomeo, "San Bartolomeo Torpedo") was built with a partly enclosed cockpit, a more powerful motor and larger  warhead (up from the earlier SLC's  warheads). Three units were made but not operationally used because Italy surrendered in 1943.

The first British version of the concept was named the Chariot manned torpedo. They were designed to be towed to their intended area of operations by a full-size 'mother' submarine.

Roughly 200 of these were made and they did manage to sink a few ships. About 500 were built.

Construction

A typical manned torpedo has a propeller, hydroplanes, a vertical rudder and a control panel with controls for its front rider. It usually allows for two riders who sit facing forwards. It has navigation aids such as a compass, and nowadays modern aids such as sonar and GPS positioning and modulated ultrasound communications gear. It may have an air (or other breathing gas) supply so its riders do not have to drain their own apparatus while they are riding it. In some the riders' seats are enclosed; in others the seats are open at the sides as in sitting astride a horse. The seat design includes room for the riders' swimfins (if used). There are flotation tanks (typically four: left fore, right fore, left aft, right aft), which can be flooded or blown empty to adjust buoyancy and attitude.

Timeline

 1909: The British designer Commander Godfrey Herbert received a patent for a manned torpedo. During World War I, it was rejected by the War Office as impracticable and unsafe.
 1 November 1918: Two men of the Regia Marina, Raffaele Paolucci and Raffaele Rossetti, in diving suits, rode a primitive manned torpedo (nicknamed Mignatta or "leech") into the  Austro-Hungarian Navy base at Pola (Istria), where they sank the Austrian battleship  and the freighter Wien using limpet mines. They had no breathing sets and they had to keep their heads above water, and thus they were discovered and taken prisoner.
 1938: In Italy the "1a Flottiglia Mezzi d'Assalto" (First Fleet Assault Vehicles) was formed as a result of the research and development efforts of two men – Major Teseo Tesei and Major Elios Toschi of the Italian Royal Navy. The pair resurrected the idea of Paolucci and Rossetti.
 1940: Commander Vittorio Moccagatta of the Italian Royal Navy reorganised the 1st Fleet Assault Vehicles into the Decima Flottiglia MAS (Tenth Light Flotilla of assault vehicles) or "X-MAS", under the command of Ernesto Forza. It secretly manufactured manned torpedoes and trained war frogmen, called nuotatori (Italian: "swimmers").
 26 July 1941: An attack on Valletta Harbour ended in disaster for the X MAS and Major Teseo Tesei lost his life.
 19 December 1941: The Decima Flottiglia MAS attacked the port of Alexandria with three maiale. Luigi Durand de la Penne and five other swimmers were taken prisoner. De la Penne was awarded the Gold Medal of Military Valor after the war.
They were swung overboard once in Norwegian waters but both became detached from their tow-hooks in a gale and the operation was a total failure.
 8 December 1942. An attack by three manned torpedoes from the  against British naval targets was thwarted in Gibraltar. Three divers were killed by depth charges when the British harbour defence "reacted furiously" to the attack. Among the dead were Lt Licio Visintini, commander of the divers unit on board the Olterra, Petty Officer Giovanni Magro and Sergeant Salvatore Leone, from Taormina, Sicily. Leone's body was never found. Sgt Leone was awarded the Medaglia d'oro al Valor Militare and a memorial was erected in the Community Gardens in Taormina on the 50th anniversary of the attack. The memorial includes a rebuilt maiale and a description of the events, in three languages.
 1–2 January 1943: British submarines ,  and  took part in Operation Principal. P311 was lost en route to La Maddelena but the other two boats had some success at Palermo, launching two and three Chariots respectively. The Ulpio Traiano was sunk and the stern torn off Viminale. However the cost was high with one submarine and one chariot lost and all but two charioteers captured.
 18 January 1943: Thunderbolt took two chariots to Tripoli for Operation Welcome. This was to prevent blockships being sunk at the harbour mouth, so denying access to the Allies. Again, partial success was achieved. This was the last operation in which chariots were carried in containers on British submarines, although some others followed with the chariots on deck without containers.
 6 May & 10 June 1943: Italian maiale from the Olterra, now under the command of Lt Ernesto Notari, sank six Allied merchant ships in Gibraltar, for a total of 42,000 tn.
 September 1943: Operation Source was an attempt to destroy warships including the Tirpitz using X-class midget subs. Of the five deployed, only two were successful. Tirpitz was badly damaged, crippled, and out of action until May 1944.
 21 June 1944: A British-Italian joint operation was mounted against shipping in La Spezia harbour. The chariots were carried on board an MTB and the cruiser Bolzano was sunk.
 6 July 1944: A German Neger-type vessel torpedoed the Royal Navy minesweepers  and Cato.
 20 July 1944: Royal Navy destroyer  was mined at anchor in Seine Bay. A German Human Torpedo was believed responsible.
 27–28 October 1944: The British submarine  carried two Mk 2 Chariots (nicknamed Tiny and Slasher) to an attack on Phuket harbor in Thailand. See British commando frogmen for more information about this attack. No manned torpedo operations in combat in any war are known with certainty after this date.
 20 November 1944: The USS Mississinewa was sunk by a Japanese kaiten manned suicide torpedo.
 Immediate post-war period: The British Chariots were used to clear mines and wrecks in harbours.

For other events, see Operations of X Flottiglia MAS and British commando frogmen.

Some nations including Italy have continued to build and deploy manned torpedoes since 1945.

Italy

World War I
 Raffaele Rossetti in 1918 created a new weapon, based on his idea of a torpedo manned by a person, to be linked to enemy vessels underwater and explode under the ship hull. This weapon was called "mignatta" (leech) and was the precursor of the maiale of World War II and the actual human torpedo.

World War II
 Siluro a Lenta Corsa (Italian, Low Speed Torpedo – SLC), also known as Maiale (Italian for "pig", plural maiali).
 Siluro San Bartolomeo (Italian, St. Bartholomew Torpedo, also called SSB). It was never used in action.
For information on Italian manned torpedo operations, see Decima Flottiglia MAS.

After 1945
 CE2F/X100 is a swimmer delivery vehicle made after 1945. They were made in Italy. Range . 2 riders. The Pakistan Navy has several of them. India and Argentina also have some.  Recent upgrades included:
 control module with a GPS
 autopilot
 digitized on board electronics
 launcher for five LCAW mini-torpedoes (optional)

United Kingdom

World War II

Endurance 5 hours (distance depended on water current). Its control handle was -shaped. 34 were made.
 Both types were made by Stothert & Pitt (crane makers) at Bath, Somerset.

Germany

World War II

Neger
This extreme form of a genuine human torpedo carried a second torpedo underneath, which was launched at the target. Speed: , and about 10 hours at 3 knots. One seat. This manned torpedo was named after its inventor Richard Mohr.

Marder and Biber
These very small submarines carried two torpedoes and one or two men. There were other types that never ran into production. 
In July 1944 Nazi Germany's Kriegsmarine introduced their human torpedoes to harass allied positions at Normandy anchorages. Although they could not submerge, they were difficult to observe at night and inflicted several losses on allied vessels. They were also used to harass allied vessels in the invasion of southern France but were largely ineffective.

Japan

World War II
 Kaiten. The Kaiten was a manned fast torpedo intended to be piloted directly into its target, in practice becoming a suicide weapon. As such, its operation differed substantially from the human torpedo as used by Italian, British and German militaries.

Russia/USSR

After 1945
 Siren. It is or was made after 1945. It is longer than a British or Italian Chariot because it has 2 warheads. It has 2 riders. It was designed to exit through a submarine's torpedo tube. See Russian commando frogmen.

United States

After 1945
There are pictures and descriptions of modern US Chariot-like underwater frogman-carriers used by SEALs and a fast surface boat that can submerge, here:
 Swimmer Delivery Vehicle (SDV) SEAL Delivery Vehicle
 Swimmer Transport Device (STD)

Other countries

Argentina

Argentina developed manned torpedoes and special mini-submarines in the 1950s, the latter with a torpedo attached under the two-men crew.

Poland
In Poland, in the months before the outbreak of the Second World War, a number of volunteers came forward to pilot torpedoes against German warships. A Bureau of Living torpedoes was set up to organize and train these volunteers, and prepare suitable equipment, but nothing had come to fruition before the German invasion and occupation.

Yugoslavia

The Yugoslav Navy did not have manned torpedoes, but frogmen used the underwater device called R-1 Diver for a variety of missions, including: mine clearance, infiltration, clandestine surveillance and  security, and assault missions on enemy shipping and naval objects.
These small apparatuses were relegated to the navies of Croatia (HRM) (1991) and Montenegro (2007).

Museums

 Original SLCs (Siluri Lenta Corsa or "Maiale") are displayed at the Naval History Museum Venice, Italy.
 There are three chariots on public view in Eden Camp Museum near Malton, North Yorkshire in England:
 A restored original British Mark II, which was found derelict in a scrapyard in Portsmouth. In this design, the two riders sat back to back.
 A working chariot that was made in 1992 in Milton Keynes with approximately the outside appearance of a British wartime Mark I, but with differing internal working parts. It has been filmed in action for the television. It has a dummy warhead. It was last used in 2006.
 A replica Italian maiale made soon after 1945 by the same Italian firm (Caproni) who made the wartime maiali. As at July 2008 this was on loan to the National Maritime Museum Cornwall in Falmouth, Cornwall, until the end of 2008, but as at 16 March 2009 it was back in Eden Camp.
 There is an Italian SSB maiale in the Naval Museum at Groton, Connecticut, United States.

Movies and fiction
 The movie The Valiant, made in 1962, is about the sinking of HMS Valiant in Alexandria harbour. There is even a 1953 Italian movie (I sette dell'Orsa Maggiore Hell Raiders of the Deep) about the attack, done with some real members of Decima Flottiglia MAS as support actors in the cast.
The film has a scene of a fight between British and German frogmen at an anti-submarine net; this never happened in the real attack on Tirpitz.
 The film The Silent Enemy (released in 1958) does not represent real events accurately. In particular, in the real world there was no attack on the Olterra, and no underwater hand-to-hand battle between Italian and British frogmen. The breathing sets used by the film actors representing the Italian frogmen seem to be British naval type rebreathers and not authentic Italian rebreathers. The three chariots seen in the movie, representing Italian maiali, were crudely made film props.
 A film The Eagle Has Landed briefly features a German paratroop Officer, a Colonel played by Michael Caine and his men who have been sent to man chariots on the Channel Islands.
 Ian Fleming who wrote the James Bond stories was in Naval Intelligence stationed at Gibraltar in the war, and was likely aware of the Italian operations. The chariot seen in the James Bond film On Her Majesty's Secret Service is a realistic-looking but non-functioning film prop. When seen it is in a kit store. It does not take part in any action; the action happens up a mountain in the Swiss Alps. Underwater vehicles (not chariot-shaped) featured in the James Bond film Thunderball.
 In Metal Gear Solid, Solid Snake uses one to approach Shadow Moses island.
 In Infinity Ward's Call of Duty: Modern Warfare 2, Operators from "Task Force 141" uses two of these to approach one of the four oil rigs. This takes place in the mission: The only easy day, was yesterday.
 In the game Battlestations: Pacific, Kaitens and Kaiten-carrying submarines are player-controllable units.
 In Hidden & Dangerous 2, the only mission set in Norway, entitled "Operation Seawolf: Steam Piping", is based on the failed Operation Title from 31 October 1942 against Tirpitz.

See also

Notes

References

 Brown, David. Warship Losses of World War Two. Arms and Armour, London, Great Britain, 1990. .
 C. Warren and J. Benson – Above Us The Waves  (Harrap 1953)
 Junio Valerio Borghese – Sea Devils (1954)
 Robert W. Hobson – "Chariots of War" (Ulric Publishing 2004) 
 Jack Greene and Alessandro Massignani – The Black Prince and the Sea Devils: The Story of Prince Valerio Borghese and the Elite Units of the Decima Mas (2004) 
 Mitchell, Pamela – Chariots of the Sea Richard Netherwood (1998) 

 Samuel Eliot Morison – History of United States Naval Operations in World War II, Volume XI (1957)

External links

  The British Chariots, diving gear and personal experiences
 Chariots in armed forces service after 1945
 Vostok: a French 2-man diver-rider that may be a chariot (article in French)
 Underwater Heritage Trust
 Eden Camp Museum
 More images of the restored British Mark II chariot
 Comando Supremo: Italy at War
 British submarines of World War 2
 Chariots, accounts of operations, pictures
 Japanese suicide weapon：Human　torpedo　Kaiten(Japanese)
 HNSA Ship Page: Italian Siluro San Bartolomeo
 Submersible boats
Eden Camp Museum

Diver propulsion equipment
Submarines
 
World War II weapons of Italy
Submarine classes
World War II submarines of the United Kingdom
Frogman operations
Italian inventions
Naval weapons of Italy
Midget submarines
Wet subs